Kodambakkam Railway Station is a railway station on the Chennai Beach–Chengalpattu section of the Chennai Suburban Railway Network. It serves the neighbourhood of Kodambakkam, Vadapalani, and Ashok Nagar. The railway station was already in existence when the Chennai Egmore-Kanchipuram suburban railway was opened in 1911.

History
The station lies in the Chennai Beach–Tambaram section of the Chennai Suburban Railway Network. With the completion of track-lying work in March 1931, which began in 1928, the suburban services were started on 11 May 1931 between Beach and Tambaram, and was electrified on 15 November 1931, with the first MG EMU services running on 1.5 kV DC. The section was converted to 25 kV AC traction on 15 January 1967.

Gallery

See also

 Chennai Suburban Railway
 Railway stations in Chennai

References

Stations of Chennai Suburban Railway
Railway stations in Chennai